These are the squads for the 1976 European Football Championship tournament in Yugoslavia, which took place between 16 June and 20 June 1976. The players' listed ages are their ages on the tournament's opening day (16 June 1976).

Czechoslovakia
Manager: Václav Ježek

Netherlands
Manager: George Knobel

West Germany
Manager: Helmut Schön

Yugoslavia
Manager: Ante Mladinić

External links
RSSSF
 weltfussball.de 

1976
Squads